Big Bow may refer to:

 Big Bow, Kansas
 Big Bow (chief) (1833–?), Kiowa war chief